Attageninae was a subfamily of beetles in the family Dermestidae. In 2003, Attageninae was reduced in rank and is now treated as the tribe Attagenini.

References

External links
Attageninae at ITIS

Dermestidae